Knowledge TV was a cable television channel owned by Jones Media Group that broadcast educational programming. The network was established on November 15, 1987 as Mind Extension University. At launch it partnered with Colorado State University and Annenberg Foundation. While the network was viewable by all, students were charged tuition to obtain credit for the course. Students submitted homework and contacted instructors via telephone. The following year, Washington State University, the University of Minnesota, Oklahoma State University, and SUNY/Empire State College also signed on. Eventually, 30 colleges and universities partnered with Mind Extension Students would submit papers and assignments either by mail or fax. In late 1996, the network was renamed Knowledge TV, and by that time it was carrying several programs dealing with new media and Silicon Valley businesses, including New Media News from KRON-TV in San Francisco, and many computer education programs such as Stewart Cheifet's Computer Chronicles. The network reached about 25 million subscribers, although many cable systems only carried the network part-time, using it to fill downtime on public access networks and late night paid programming blocks on networks such as Discovery Channel.

In 1999, Discovery Communications bought out the network and it was closed in 2000, as Discovery planned to give cable operators the option of converting the channel to Discovery Health.

References 

Television channels and stations established in 1987
Television channels and stations disestablished in 2000
Defunct television networks in the United States